Bergdorf Goodman Inc. is a luxury department store based on Fifth Avenue in Midtown Manhattan, New York.  The company was founded in 1899 by Herman Bergdorf and was later owned and managed by Edwin Goodman, and later his son, Andrew Goodman.

Today, Bergdorf Goodman operates from two stores situated across the street from each other at Fifth Avenue between 57th Street and 58th Streets.  The main store, which opened at its current location in 1928, is located on the west side of Fifth Avenue. A separate men's store, established in 1990, is located on the east side of Fifth Avenue, directly across the street.

Bergdorf Goodman is a subsidiary of Neiman Marcus, which is owned by the private equity firm Ares Management.

History

Founding and early history (1899–1951)
The company traces its origins to 1899 when Herman Bergdorf, an immigrant from Alsace, opened a tailor shop just above Union Square in downtown Manhattan.

Edwin Goodman, a 23-year-old American Jewish merchant, based in Lockport, New York, moved to New York City to work as an apprentice for Bergdorf.  Within two years, Goodman had raised enough money to purchase an interest in the business, which was renamed Bergdorf Goodman in 1901.  In 1906, Bergdorf Goodman moved to a new location on 32nd Street, just west of Fifth Avenue and "Ladies' Mile".  While Bergdorf preferred the less expensive side street location, Goodman prevailed with the new location and bought Bergdorf's interest in the company.  Bergdorf would retire to Paris.

Although Goodman had developed a good business as a ladies' tailor on 32nd Street, he decided to move uptown in 1914.  Goodman constructed a five-story building at 616 Fifth Avenue, on the site of what is today Rockefeller Center.  In 1914, Goodman became the first couturier to introduce ready-to-wear, making Bergdorf Goodman a destination for American and French fashion.

The store moved to its present location at Fifth Avenue and 58th Street in 1928, building its Beaux-Arts style Bergdorf Goodman Building on the site of the Cornelius Vanderbilt II House. He was unsure of the success of the new store's location, as he was uncertain whether customers would follow the store uptown.  So, Goodman designed the new store so that it could be subdivided into sections with storefronts that could be rented out if needed.  Early tenants included Van Cleef & Arpels, the Grande Maison de Blanc and Dobbs the Hatter.  During the Great Depression, however, Goodman thrived, buying the entire building.  Throughout the 1930s, Goodman purchased the mortgages of the surrounding businesses, eventually acquiring the entire block.  During this period, Bergdorf Goodman was successful enough to have merited an expansion beyond the single store.  However, Goodman preferred to operate in a single location where he would be able to personally maintain the quality of the merchandise and service.

The second generation (1951–1972)

Goodman's son, Andrew, assumed the role of president in 1951 and succeeded as head of the company in 1953, following the death of his father.  Andrew was responsible for enhancing Bergdorf's reputation and expanding its range of merchandise and services.

During Andrew's tenure as chairman, Bergdorf opened a fur salon (headed by Emeric Partos from 1955-1975), developed the successful Bergdorf Goodman Number Nine perfume ("Love Potion Number Nine"), and created Miss Bergdorf, a ready-to-wear line for younger customers.

The Bergdorf Goodman Building began a $1 million expansion in 1959 ($ million today) into two adjacent buildings. The Boys and Girls gift shop expanded into a whole floor, and the beauty salon and bridal, fur and men's departments also expanded.

New ownership (1972–1990)
In 1972, Andrew Goodman sold Bergdorf Goodman to Broadway-Hale Stores, which would become Carter Hawley Hale Stores (CHH) for $12.5 million ($ million today). CHH had acquired Neiman Marcus, a three-unit operation at the time, in 1969. By the time of the sale, Bergdorf Goodman was the only large high-quality specialty store in the U.S. that remained independently owned. However, its decision not to build suburban branches left it with a relatively modest profit margin. Goodman remained the landlord of the store and kept a penthouse apartment on the building's top floor.

At first, CHH considered building branch locations, ultimately only constructing one location, in nearby White Plains, New York, in 1972. This location eventually became a Neiman Marcus branch in 1981. To combat its image difficulties, the company hired Dawn Mello in 1975 as vice president of fashion. She was successful in reinvigorating the conservative store and became president in 1984. She left her post in 1989 to work for the floundering Italian fashion house Gucci, though she returned to her post as president in 1994.

Bergdorf Goodman's parent company became the object of takeover bids in the 1980s. As a way to maintain its independence, Carter Hawley completed a major financial restructuring.  In 1987, Bergdorf Goodman was spun-off, together with Neiman Marcus and Contempo Casuals, to form Neiman Marcus Group.  The new company was headquartered in Dallas, Texas, where the significantly larger Neiman Marcus had been based for 80 years.

Reaching the centennial (1990–present)
Chairman and CEO Ira Neimark expanded the women's store three times in the 1990s. He moved the men's store across the street to the former FAO Schwarz space at 745 Fifth Avenue in 1990. This move allowed more space for women's fashions. In 1997, the former Goodman family apartment on the building's ninth floor became the John Barrett Salon and Susan Ciminelli Day Spa. In 1999, the Beauty Level opened directly below the main floor, offering a luxury spa and Goodman's Café, serving lunch and afternoon tea.

In 2002, the Bergdorf Goodman Building underwent a major restoration, including a restoration of the main floor of the women's store. In 2003, the store introduced new boutiques for Chanel, Giorgio Armani, Gucci, Versace, and Yves Saint Laurent. The Bergdorf Goodman Men's store features exclusive brands such as Loro Piana, Kiton, Brunello Cucinelli, John Lobb, Thom Browne, Bontoni, Tom Ford, and Charvet.

On May 2, 2005, two private equity firms, Texas Pacific Group and Warburg Pincus, acquired the Neiman Marcus Group and its  Bergdorf subsidiary, in a leveraged buyout (LBO).

In media and popular culture
The store has been the subject of two documentary films: the 2001 film Dita and the Family Business, exploring the store from the point of view of its owners, and the 2013 feature documentary Scatter My Ashes at Bergdorf's, which features many testimonials from designers and celebrities. In 1953’s movie How to Marry a Millionaire, Lauren Bacall, Betty Grable, and Marilyn Monroe consider “the mink department at Bergdorf’s” the ideal location to meet men. Cary Grant sent Doris Day on a shopping spree at the store in the 1962 movie That Touch of Mink. The store has also made several appearances in the cartoon Neo Yokio. The protagonist, Kaz Kaan, and his rival, Arcangelo, both buy their suits from Bergdorf's. Most recently, Bergdorf Goodman was featured in a scene of the film Ocean's 8 in which Sandra Bullock's character steals cosmetics from the store. In 2019, news journalist E. Jean Carroll alleged that Donald Trump had sexually assaulted her in a Bergdorf Goodman dressing room in the 1990s. The store was prominently featured in the film Arthur in 1981. The store was featured in the Miss Piggy/ Joan Rivers scene of The Muppets Take Manhattan. The store was also featured in Sex and the City as a favorite shopping location of central character Carrie Bradshaw.  It was particularly featured in the Sex and the City 2 movie. In the television show Parks and Recreation, the character April Ludgate pretends on multiple occasions to be an exaggerated socialite named "Janet Snakehole," whose husband keeps her in "the finest Bergdorf Goodman" clothing. The first time April plays this character within a character, she is mock arrested by another character-in-character, Andy Dwyer pretending to be FBI agent Burt Macklin. Macklin attempts to arrest Snakehole, causing Snakehole to shriek that she never stole the (assumedly Bergdorf Goodman) jewels, her sister did, "but now she's been eaten by wolves!"

See also
List of department stores
National Register of Historic Places listings in Manhattan from 14th to 59th Streets
List of New York City Designated Landmarks in Manhattan from 14th to 59th Streets

References

External links

 Bergdorf Goodman website
 Bergdorf Goodman Company History.  Funding Universe
 Scatter My Ashes at Bergdorf's Documentary

1899 establishments in New York City
1972 mergers and acquisitions
American companies established in 1899
Clothing retailers of the United States
Department stores of the United States
Fifth Avenue
Midtown Manhattan
New York City Designated Landmarks in Manhattan
Retail companies established in 1899
Shops in New York City
Companies that filed for Chapter 11 bankruptcy in 2020